Demolition Man is an EP released by A&M on September 21, 1993 (United States) and November 1, 1993 (UK) in support of the Sylvester Stallone/Wesley Snipes film Demolition Man. It features Sting's re-recording of The Police track "Demolition Man", as well as several live recordings. The live recordings were recorded at Villa Manin, Codroipo, Italy on 25 July 1993. The US and International/European EP release features the title track and five live recordings and sales for this release were listed on the US Albums Chart, as the UK release was a standard single which featured an exclusive single version of the title track as well as the album version and two live recordings. The UK release charted therefore on the UK Singles Chart, where it peaked at number 21.

Reception

AllMusic panned the American version in their brief review, claiming that the recordings are "unremarkable" and that the retail price (over $10, nearly as much as most full-length albums retailed for at the time) was inexcusable.

Track listing
US EP (31454 0162 2) / International (Europe) EP (540 162-2)
"Demolition Man" (Sting) – 5:27
"King of Pain" (live) (Sting) – 7:21
"Shape of My Heart" (live) (Sting, Dominic Miller) – 4:32
"Love Is Stronger Than Justice (The Munificent Seven)" (live) (Sting) – 7:29
"It's Probably Me" (live) (Eric Clapton, Michael Kamen, Sting) – 6:18
"A Day in the Life" (live) (John Lennon, Paul McCartney) – 4:06

UK CDS (580 453-2)
"Demolition Man" (Soulpower Mix Edit) (Sting) – 3:40
"Demolition Man" (film version) (Sting) – 5:27
"It's Probably Me" (live) (Clapton, Kamen, Sting) – 6:18
"A Day in the Life" (live) (Lennon, McCartney) – 4:06

Personnel
 Sting – vocals, guitar
 Dominic Miller – guitars
 Mark Egan – bass guitar
 David Sancious – keyboards
 Vinnie Colaiuta – drums
 Arik Marshall – guitars
 Paul Bushnell – bass guitar
 Ann Bennett Nesby – backing vocals and solo ad-libs
 Jamecia Bennett – backing vocals
 Core Cotton – backing vocals
 Shirley Marie Graham – backing vocals

Charts

References

Sting (musician) soundtracks
1993 soundtrack albums
1993 EPs
Sting (musician) EPs
A&M Records EPs
Science fiction film soundtracks
Action film soundtracks